Carroll Dawson is an American former assistant coach and general manager in the National Basketball Association (NBA). He worked for the Houston Rockets franchise for 27 years before retiring in 2007.

College playing career 
A native of Alba, Texas, Dawson played collegiate basketball at Paris Junior College, where he attained the nickname, "Big Orange" and at Baylor University, during the late 1950s and early 1960s.  In 1960, the 6'5" center earned All-Southwest Conference honors, after averaging 16.4 points per game for the Baylor Bears.

Career biography 
After his college career, he was drafted into the Army, and stationed at Fort Knox, as a tank commander. From 1973 to 1977, he then served as Baylor's men's basketball head coach.  He then worked as a scout for the NFL's Dallas Cowboys, and as a salesman for Converse shoes, before becoming an assistant coach for the Houston Rockets in 1979.

In 1989, Dawson was struck by lightning, during a golf outing, and over the next few years, his vision became progressively worse.  Unable to continue his coaching duties, Dawson moved to the Rockets' front office, becoming general manager in 1996.  Dawson's career with The Rockets lasted 27 years. Among his most notable accomplishments as the general manager of the Rockets, were his selection of Yao Ming in the 2002 NBA Draft, and his seven-player trade to acquire NBA scoring champ Tracy McGrady, in 2004.

After announcing Daryl Morey as his successor, the Rockets honored Dawson by hanging a banner with the initials "CD" in the rafters of the Toyota Center, during a game with the Phoenix Suns.

Head coaching record

References

External links 
 Career retrospective at NBA.com

American men's basketball players
Basketball coaches from Texas
Basketball players from Texas
Baylor Bears men's basketball coaches
Baylor Bears men's basketball players
Centers (basketball)
Dallas Cowboys scouts
Houston Rockets assistant coaches
Houston Rockets general managers
Living people
Paris Dragons basketball players
People from Rains County, Texas
People from Wood County, Texas
1938 births